The maples belong to the genus Acer, an important group of mainly deciduous trees and shrubs in the family Sapindaceae, which are widely cultivated throughout the temperate northern hemisphere. Some, such as Acer griseum, have ornamental bark; but most are valued in cultivation for their brilliant autumn foliage in shades of yellow, orange and red. A vast number of cultivars have been developed for garden use. The palmate maple Acer palmatum alone has thousands of cultivars, many of which originate in Japan where the plant is especially prized for its compact size and elegant domed shape. Many maple species lend themselves to bonsai treatment. 

All tolerate a range of growing conditions, but prefer a partially shaded, sheltered position in soil that is well-drained but also retains moisture. The following is a selected list of cultivars which in the UK have gained the Royal Horticultural Society’s Award of Garden Merit (confirmed 2018).

References

Maple
Lists of Award of Garden Merit plants